R. D. Evans may refer to:

 Robley D. Evans (admiral) (1846–1912), rear admiral of the United States Navy
 Robley D. Evans (physicist) (1907–1995), American physicist
 R. D. Evans (jockey) (fl. 1979–1990), jockey in Sixty Sails Handicap
 Robert Evans (wrestler) ("Barrister" R. D. Evans; born 1983)